June 3 - Eastern Orthodox Church calendar - June 5

All fixed commemorations below celebrated on June 17 by Orthodox Churches on the Old Calendar.

For June 4th, Orthodox Churches on the Old Calendar commemorate the Saints listed on May 22.

Saints
 Saints Mary and Martha, sisters of Saint Lazarus (1st century)
 Hieromartyr Astius, Bishop of Dyrrachium in Macedonia (2nd century)
 Saint Titus, Bishop of Byzantium (3rd century)
 Holy Martyrs of Niculitsel, Romania (320):
 Hieromartyr Apotacius and Martyrs Zoticus, Atallus, Camasius, Philip, and 31 others, including: 
 Eutychius, Quirinus, Julia, Saturninus, Ninita, Fortunio, Gaddanus, and Amasus, beheaded at Noviodunum (Niculitel), in Scythia Minor.
 Saint Metrophanes of Byzantium, first Archbishop of Constantinople (c. 326)
 Venerable Alonius of Scetis in Egypt (5th century)
 Saint Zosimas of Cilicia, Bishop of Babylon in Egypt (6th century)
 Monk-martyr John, Abbot, of Monagria Monastery, in Cyprus (761)
 Venerable Sophia of Ainos, Thrace, Mother of Orphans (10th-11th centuries)

Pre-Schism Western saints
 Saint Clateus, one of the earliest Bishops of Brescia in Italy, martyred under Nero (c. 64)
 Martyrs Frontasius, Severinus, Severian, and Silanus, of Gaul (1st century)
 Martyr Concordius of Spoleto (c. 175)
 Martyrs Aretius (Arecius, Aregius) and Dacian, in Rome.
 Saint Saturnina, a virgin-martyr from Germany murdered near Arras in France.
 Saint Quirinus, a martyr in Tivoli near Rome.
 Saint Quirinus of Sescia, Bishop of Siscia (Sisak or Seseg), now in Croatia (308)
 Saint Rutilus and Companions, martyrs at Sabaria (Sabar) in Pannonia, now Hungary.
 Saint Optatus, Bishop of Milevum in Numidia (376)
 Venerable Nennocha (Ninnoca, Nennoc, Gwengustle), a holy virgin from Britain who followed St Germanus to France, becoming an abbess in Brittany at Ploërmel or Pleumeur-Gautier (c. 467)
 Venerable Breaca, a disciple of St Brigid who crossed from Ireland to Cornwall (c. 460) with several companions (5th-6th centuries)
 Venerable Petroc (Petrock, Pedrog, Perreux), Abbot, in Cornwall (c. 594)
 Saints Croidan, Medan and Degan, three disciples of St Petroc in Cornwall (6th century)
 Saint Buriana, born in Ireland, she lived as an anchoress in Cornwall (6th century)
 Saint Eadfrith of Lindisfarne (Edfrith), Bishop of Lindisfarne in England after St Edbert, he illuminated the Lindisfarne Gospels in honour of St Cuthbert (721)
 Saint Alexander, Bishop of Verona in Italy (8th century)
 Saint Aldegrin (Adalgrin), a noble who became a monk near Cluny in France (939)
 Saint Elsiar, a monk at Saint-Savin Abbey in Lavedan in France (c. 1050)

Post-Schism Orthodox saints
 Venerable Methodius, founder of Peshnosha Monastery, Moscow, disciple of St. Sergius of Radonezh (1392)
 Saints Eleazar and Nazarius, Wonderworkers, of Olonets (15th century)

New martyrs and confessors
 New Hieromartyr Peter Belyaev, Priest (1918)
 New Hieromartyr Đorđe Bogić, protopresbyter in the Serbian Orthodox Church in Našice, killed by the Ustashas (1941)
 New Hieromartyr Ioannicius (Lipovac), Metropolitan of Montenegro and the Littoral (1945)  (see also: June 18 )

Other commemorations
 Repose of Hieromonk Bartholomew of Neamts and Svir (1864)
 Repose of the righteous sisters Vera (June 4) and Lyubov (June 8), foundresses of the Shamordino Convent (1883)
 Uncovering of the relics (1999) of New Hieromartyr Peter (Zverev), Archbishop of Voronezh and Zadonsk (1929)

Icon gallery

Notes

References

Sources
 June 4/17. Orthodox Calendar (PRAVOSLAVIE.RU).
 June 17 / June 4. HOLY TRINITY RUSSIAN ORTHODOX CHURCH (A parish of the Patriarchate of Moscow).
 June 4. OCA - The Lives of the Saints.
 The Autonomous Orthodox Metropolia of Western Europe and the Americas (ROCOR). St. Hilarion Calendar of Saints for the year of our Lord 2004. St. Hilarion Press (Austin, TX). p. 41.
 The Fourth Day of the Month of June. Orthodoxy in China.
 June 4. Latin Saints of the Orthodox Patriarchate of Rome.
 The Roman Martyrology. Transl. by the Archbishop of Baltimore. Last Edition, According to the Copy Printed at Rome in 1914. Revised Edition, with the Imprimatur of His Eminence Cardinal Gibbons. Baltimore: John Murphy Company, 1916. pp. 163–164.
 Rev. Richard Stanton. A Menology of England and Wales, or, Brief Memorials of the Ancient British and English Saints Arranged According to the Calendar, Together with the Martyrs of the 16th and 17th Centuries. London: Burns & Oates, 1892. pp. 253–255.
Greek Sources
 Great Synaxaristes:  4 ΙΟΥΝΙΟΥ. ΜΕΓΑΣ ΣΥΝΑΞΑΡΙΣΤΗΣ.
  Συναξαριστής. 4 Ιουνίου. ECCLESIA.GR. (H ΕΚΚΛΗΣΙΑ ΤΗΣ ΕΛΛΑΔΟΣ). 
  04/06/2017. Ορθόδοξος Συναξαριστής. 
Russian Sources
  17 июня (4 июня). Православная Энциклопедия под редакцией Патриарха Московского и всея Руси Кирилла (электронная версия). (Orthodox Encyclopedia - Pravenc.ru).
  4 июня по старому стилю / 17 июня по новому стилю. Русская Православная Церковь - Православный церковный календарь на 2016 год.
  4 июня (ст.ст.) 17 июня 2014 (нов. ст.). Русская Православная Церковь Отдел внешних церковных связей. (DECR).

June in the Eastern Orthodox calendar